The Wheel of Manchester was a transportable Ferris wheel installation at Piccadilly Gardens, Manchester, England. The wheel was originally a smaller installation based in Exchange Square, first assembled in 2004. However, these plans were never submitted. The wheel was dismantled in 2012 to make way for 2012 Olympics celebrations and Metrolink construction work. In 2013, a new  wheel was installed in Piccadilly Gardens. It was dismantled in June 2015.

History

2004–2007
The first wheel was first installed in 2004 which was a success and consequently a larger  wheel was erected in May 2007.

2007–2012
The wheel returned in May 2007 and was sponsored by the Manchester Evening News. A larger wheel was initially planned for 2008, but it was never installed. In 2010, Manchester City Council proposed a  wheel, to be operated by World Tourist Attractions, as a replacement for the existing transportable installation, with Piccadilly Gardens the possible site and completion expected by Christmas 2011. The installation was later taken over by Great City Attractions when World Tourist Attractions merged with Great Wheel Corporation. In 2011 it became known as The Capital Wheel of Manchester, through a sponsorship deal with Capital FM. Although plans for a larger wheel were not publicly rejected, they never materialised.

The  wheel was removed in April 2012. Great City Attractions recommended to move the wheel to another area of the city such as Piccadilly Gardens, but this was rejected with the Council airing concerns about the wheel limiting space in Piccadilly. Manchester City Council stated that they thought the wheel had "probably run its course in terms of an attraction" since its opening in 2004. The Council also added that space in Exchange Square was required for a number of reasons, including public viewing space for the 2012 Olympics and space for adjacent redevelopment projects, such as Exchange Square Metrolink station, the Metrolink second city crossing on Corporation Street, and the renovation of The Triangle. Following its last day of operation on 15 April 2012, it was dismantled and moved to Edinburgh.

The removal of the Ferris wheel was welcomed by some who believed the wheel had run its course as an attraction. Tony Wilson, one of Manchester's most famous cultural patrons, hated the Ferris wheel stating: "It ruins a perfectly good square and it's a poor imitation of something London's done a lot better. We shouldn't be doing it."

2013–2015

In 2013, a new  wheel returned to Manchester to replace the original for New Years celebrations. However, this wheel was located at Piccadilly Gardens. A disagreement between Manchester City Council and the owners Wheels Entertainments arose after the licence to run the attraction ran out in April 2015.

References

Transportable Ferris wheels
Tourist attractions in Manchester
Buildings and structures in Manchester
2012 disestablishments in England
2015 disestablishments in England
Piccadilly Gardens